Akron Northside is a Cuyahoga Valley Scenic Railroad train station in Akron, Ohio. It is located adjacent to Ridge Street near Howard Street. It is the southern terminus of the Cuyahoga Valley Scenic Railroad.

History

This location was previously served by the Howard Street station of the Valley Railway (which was acquired by the Baltimore and Ohio Railroad starting in 1890). Trains began stopping here in 1880. By 1948, the station was served by the Cleveland Night Express, Shenandoah, and Washington Night Express.

Cuyahoa Valley Line (later renamed the Cuyahoga Valley Scenic Railroad) excursion trains began operating here in 1977.

References

Cuyahoga Valley Scenic Railroad stations
Former Baltimore and Ohio Railroad stations
Transportation in Akron, Ohio
Former railway stations in Ohio
Railway stations in the United States opened in 1880
Railway stations in the United States opened in 1977